Edgar Arthur Wayburn (September 17, 1906 – March 5, 2010) was an American environmentalist who was elected president of the Sierra Club five times in the 1960s. He has been described as one of the least-known and yet most successful defenders of America's natural heritage. He is considered instrumental to achievements such as the creation of the Golden Gate National Recreation Area, the creation and later expansion of Redwood National Park and Point Reyes National Seashore, and the expansion of Mount Tamalpais State Park.

Biography 
He was born on September 17, 1906 in Macon, Georgia. He graduated from University of Georgia in 1926 and from Harvard Medical School in 1930. He moved to San Francisco in 1933 to practice medicine. He joined the Sierra Club in 1939 to participate in a burro trip. After four years in the military in England as a doctor with the Army Air Forces, he returned to San Francisco. He was elected to the executive committee of the local Sierra Club chapter, and formed its first conservation committee. In 1947 he married Peggy Elliott, and together they were involved in some of the key battles of their time to protect wild places so that future generations can explore and enjoy them. In particular, he played a central role in the establishment of Redwoods National Park and the Golden Gate National Recreation Area, as well as in the passage of the Alaska National Interest Lands Conservation Act.

In 1995, he was awarded the Albert Schweitzer Prize for Humanitarianism and in 1999 President Clinton awarded him the Presidential Medal of Freedom. Upon presenting the 1999 Presidential Medal of Freedom to Wayburn, President Clinton said that he had "saved more of our wilderness than any other person alive." The Los Angeles Times wrote an article commending the award, saying "The White House has made a well-informed choice in selecting Wayburn, 92, as a recipient next Wednesday of the Medal of Freedom, the nation's highest civilian honor."

Wayburn published his memoir Your Land and Mine: Evolution of a Conservationist in 2004. 

Wayburn was honored at a 40th Anniversary Gala Celebration as the recipient of the inaugural Howard C. Zahniser Lifetime Achievement Award, given to someone whose life of achievement in protecting wilderness most closely parallels those of the person principally responsible for the Wilderness Act.

He died of natural causes on the evening of March 5, 2010 at the age of 103. At the time he was at his home in San Francisco with his family by his side. He was survived by four children: Cynthia Wayburn, Diana Wayburn, Laurie Wayburn, and William Wayburn.

Activism 
Wayburn served five terms as the Sierra Club's elected President, and was named the Club's Honorary President in 1993. During a half-century of environmental achievements, Wayburn led and won campaigns to protect millions of acres of America's coasts, mountains, forests and tundra. Wayburn has left his mark in the following ways:

 Establishing the nation's largest urban park, the Golden Gate National Recreation Area. Included in the park's 76,000 acre (310 km²) expanse are San Francisco's beaches, Alcatraz and the Presidio
 Protecting over 100 million acres (400,000 km²) of Alaskan wild lands with the Alaska National Interest Lands Conservation Act, which doubled the size of Denali National Park, created 10 new National Parks, and doubled the size of America's National Park system
 Creating Redwood National Park, and then doubling the park's size 10 years later;
 Increasing the area of California's Mount Tamalpais State Park from 870 to 6,300 acres (3.5 to 25 km²). Mount Tamalpais is now among the state's 10 most-visited state parks
 Establishing the Point Reyes National Seashore
 Establishing Wilderness areas throughout the American West

References

External links
 Finding Aid to the Edgar Wayburn papers, 1923-2010 (bulk 1951-2007), The Bancroft Library

1906 births
2010 deaths
Sierra Club presidents
American centenarians
American conservationists
Men centenarians
Sierra Club awardees
Presidential Medal of Freedom recipients
University of Georgia alumni
Harvard Medical School alumni